Brian G. Sparkes (November 4, 1941 – December 18, 2011) was a Canadian biochemist. In 1968, he was the first to isolate a naturally occurring bacterial growth inhibitor in a discovery that had worldwide impact for cancer research. His groundbreaking paper was published in the academic journal  Science.  He was awarded a National Cancer Institute fellowship to study at McGill University.  Sparkes performed pioneering research in the role of immune failure in burn injuries. In 1994 he was awarded the "Ambroise Pare Award" for his work on burn injury.

Sparkes was born November 4, 1941 in Newport, Monmouthshire. He immigrated to Canada in 1951 and completed his  secondary schooling in London, Ontario. Sparkes Earning two degrees from the University of Western Ontario, and earned his doctorate at the University of Ottawa.

Sparkes died, at the age of 70, at St. Michael's Hospital in Toronto, Ontario after succumbing to the effects of aggressive lymphoma.

References
The Globe and Mail - January 26, 2012, p.R5 - Brilliant biochemist was an authority on the immunology of burn injury

1941 births
2011 deaths
Canadian biochemists
People from Newport, Wales
Welsh emigrants to Canada
University of Western Ontario alumni
University of Ottawa alumni